Kojsko is a village in the Municipality of Brda in the Littoral region of Slovenia.

The parish church in the village is dedicated to the Assumption of Mary and belongs to the Koper Diocese. A second church belonging to this parish is built on a hill above the village and is dedicated to the Holy Cross

References

External links
 Kojsko on Geopedia

Populated places in the Municipality of Brda